Homeobox protein ESX1 is a protein that in humans is encoded by the ESX1 gene.

References

Further reading